Budithi Bell and Brass Craft are the products made out of alloy like brass at Budithi, a village in Srikakulam district of the Indian state of Andhra Pradesh. It was registered as one of the geographical indication handicraft from Andhra Pradesh as per Geographical Indications of Goods (Registration and Protection) Act, 1999. It was registered as one of the handicraft in the geographical indication from Andhra Pradesh by Geographical Indications of Goods (Registration and Protection) Act, 1999.

Brass objects 

The artisans mainly work on creating brassware objects such as, bells for temples, cooking utensils, flower pots, lamps etc., which have different geometric patterns as well.

See also 
Bidriware
Kinnal Craft
Navalgund Durries
List of Geographical Indications in India

References 

Geographical indications in Andhra Pradesh
Indian metalwork
Culture of Andhra Pradesh
Srikakulam district
Brass